Kharyyalakh (Xarıyalaax) is a rural locality (a selo), one of three settlements, in addition to Chkalov and Tit-Ary, the centre of the rural settlement, in Tit-Arinsky Rural Okrug of Khangalassky District in the Sakha Republic, Russia. Its population as of the 2002 Census was 8.

References

Notes

Sources
Official website of the Sakha Republic. Registry of the Administrative-Territorial Divisions of the Sakha Republic. Khangalassky District. 

Rural localities in Khangalassky District